Carlotta Freeman (c.1877–June 11, 1954) was an American stage actress. She was one of the first African American women in the legitimate theatre.

Biography

Born Carlotta Thomas, she made her professional acting debut in 1905 and her first appearance on the New York stage in 1912. In 1915, she became one of the original members of the Anita Bush Stock Company (later called the Lafayette Players), one of the first black repertory theatre companies.

She also starred in several operettas written by her husband, H. Lawrence Freeman, such as Voodoo which premiered in 1928.

She died on June 11, 1954 in New York City, just a few months after her husband.

References

1870s births
1954 deaths
African-American actresses
Actresses from Charleston, South Carolina
20th-century American actresses
20th-century African-American women
20th-century African-American people